The British Entertainment History Project (BEHP) records and preserves interviews with the men and women who have worked in British film, television, radio and theatre industries over the last 100 years "to ensure that their lives and experiences are preserved for future generations".

History 
Founded in 1987 by Roy Fowler, the History Project started as an independent volunteer project by members of the industry trade union, ACTT, who wanted to preserve the stories and memories of the lives of the men and women who had been working in the various film and television industries. The organisation was originally called the ACTT History Project, reflecting the fact that though it was an entirely separate project run by volunteers, it was nevertheless supported by the ACTT union. In 1991, the ACTT merged with the Broadcasting and Entertainment Trades Alliance, to form BECTU (Broadcasting, Entertainment, Cinematograph and Theatre Union) and the ACTT History Project became known as the BECTU History Project. In 2016, it was officially registered as a company limited by guarantee, as an independent, non-profit, voluntary organisation, and renamed the British Entertainment History Project.

The work of the project continues to be acknowledged and supported by BECTU, industry-related unions and many other media organisations and educational institutions.

Archive collection 
Over the last thirty years, the BECTU History Project has built one of the world's largest archives of industry-related memory. The unique and internationally recognised archive collection has grown to over 700 oral history interviews and over 4,000 hours of audio and video recordings making it the largest independent oral history collection of its kind in the UK.

The recordings are used as a primary source by researchers and students, especially in the fields of media and social history. In addition, the archive is used by television and radio programmes, film documentaries, publishers, authors, historians, obituarists and journalists as well as the general public. Other partnerships and collaborations include work with the BFI, the BBC, the British Universities Film & Video Council and with universities such as the University of East Anglia. In 2017, the BEHP began working with Sussex University and other partners as part of the '100 voices That Made The BBC', which is part of the Connected Histories of the BBC, funded by the Arts and Humanities Research Council (AHRC).

Copies of all interview recordings also form part of the National Film archive of the British Film Institute and a significant number were made available as part of BFI Screen Online.

Interviewees 
The interviewees are mainly drawn from professionals in the relevant industries working in the United Kingdom, but also include British professionals who worked abroad. Although the archive includes many well-known or major interviewees, the overall emphasis is on reflecting genuine breadth and variety, including those who may not be well known, but who, nevertheless have contributed to, or witnessed, interesting or important productions or simply have a unique story to tell. Capturing their reminiscences provides information about, and underpins, the cultural history of Britain's broadcasting and entertainment, whilst also shining a light on employment practices and the wider social history of particular periods. The aim is that future historians of the moving image and entertainment industries will have access to extensive personal testimonies from actual participants in these activities.

Interviewees include actors such as Jill Balcon, and Robert Beatty, union officials, director/producers (Lord Richard Attenborough, Bimbi Harris, John Krish), presenters such as Pete Murray and performers such as Kenny Lynch. One of the earliest recordings is of an interview with Adolph Simon, a silent newsreel cameraman who worked in 1914. In addition there are interviews with veterans such as Earl Cameron CBE and Jack Hollingshead who joined the BBC in 1930. Most of the crafts and grades are represented, including major cinematographers such as Freddie Young, Art Directors such as Carmen Dillon, Continuity Girls, and Sound Recordists.

Notable interviewees 
 
 John Ammonds
 Derek Boshier
 Dallas Bower
 David Cobham
 Jill Craigie
 Charles Crichton
 John Dark
 Colin Dean
 Desmond Dickinson
 Clive Donner
 Edward Dryhurst
 John Elliot (author)
 David Elstein
 Bryan Forbes
 Freddie Francis
 Cyril Frankel
 Harold French
 James Gilbert (producer)
 Bob Godfrey
 Jack Gold
 Guy Green (filmmaker)
 John Halas
 Gordon Hales
 John Hough (director)
 Joan Kemp-Welch
 John Krish
 Bill Mason (director)
 Ernest Maxin
 Christopher Miles
 John Mills
 Ivor Montagu
 Christopher Morahan
 Diana Morgan (screenwriter)
 John Schlesinger
 Francis Searle
 Don Sharp
 Michael Smedley-Aston
 Jeremy Summers
 Diane Tammes
 Bernard Vorhaus
 Aida Young

Awards 
In 1999, the History Project was awarded a £3,500 grant from the Kraszna Krausz Foundation to help towards the enormous task of transcribing hundreds of audio tapes.

In 2010, the History Project was honoured with a Lifetime Contribution to Broadcasting Award at a ceremony at BAFTA.

See also
 The Interviews: An Oral History of Television

References

External links 
British Entertainment History Project (BEHP)
BEHP Vimeo channel
BEHP at Companies House
BECTU
BFI Screen Online Oral History

Entertainment industry
Oral history